Bryopolia is a genus of moths of the family Noctuidae. The genus was erected by Charles Boursin in 1954.

Species
Bryopolia bryoxenoides Gyulai & Varga, 1998 Kyrgyzstan
Bryopolia boursini Plante, 1983 Afghanistan
Bryopolia chamaeleon (Alphéraky, 1887) Turkestan
Bryopolia chrysospora Boursin, 1954 Turkestan
Bryopolia holosericea Boursin, 1960 Afghanistan
Bryopolia monotona Varga, Ronkay & Hacker, 1990 Afghanistan
Bryopolia orophasma Boursin, 1960 Afghanistan
Bryopolia ronkayorum Hacker & Kautt, 1996
Bryopolia tenuicornis (Alphéraky, 1887) Turkestan
Bryopolia thomasi Varga, Ronkay & Hacker, 1990 Ladakh, Pakistan
Bryopolia tsvetaevi Varga & Ronkay, 1990 Afghanistan, Pamir
Bryopolia tribulis Plante, 1983 Afghanistan
Bryopolia virescens (Hampson, 1894) Kashmir

References

Cuculliinae